Woodside is a village in Victoria, Australia.

Until its demolition in 2015, the tallest construction of the southern hemisphere — the aerial mast of the VLF Transmitter Woodside — was located near the village. There is also a nearby beach of the same name.

A railway connected Woodside with the railhead of Port Albert from 22 June 1923 until 25 May 1953.

An Australian oil and gas company, Woodside Petroleum, is named after this area.

See also
Woodside railway station
Woodside railway line

Notes

Towns in Victoria (Australia)
Shire of Wellington